Britvic Soft Drinks Ltd v Messer UK Ltd [2002] EWCA Civ 548 is a notable English contract law case, concerning the application of the Unfair Contract Terms Act 1977 in the context of consumer protection and a supply chain.

Facts
Messer UK Ltd supplied Britvic with carbon dioxide for its drinks. It was contaminated with benzene, a carcinogen. Britvic had to recall its products and it sued Messer to recover its costs, arguing that it was in breach of contract. A term in the contract limited liability of Messer under s 14 of the Sale of Goods Act 1979 (which by virtue of UCTA 1977 can only be limited as it satisfies the requirement of reasonableness).

The judge found that the only relevant express term in the supply agreement was that the carbon dioxide would conform with British Standard 4105. But the implied term under Sale of Goods Act 1979 s 14 also applied. Breach of both terms allowed the recovery of damages. Messer appealed, arguing that BS 4105 could not be regarded as containing an express term that gave rise to damages and that the term limiting s 14 did in fact satisfy the reasonableness test.

Judgment
Mance LJ dismissed the appeal and held in favour of Britvic. The judge had in fact been wrong on the first point, that BS 4105 contained an express term relevant to benzene and giving rise to damages, because it could not be read as a general undertaking of suitability.

But the judge had been right that Messer's exclusion of liability for s 14 SGA 1979 was unreasonable. As a supplier, rather than manufacturer, this represented that it complied with BS 4105, the required purity level at the time. Although you could comply with BS 4105, this did not mean the carbon dioxide was suitable for use. The exclusion was unreasonable because it contradicted the assumption that manufacture and supply would exclude introduction of foreign elements. Buyers could not be expected to test for elements they had no reason to suspect. So it must be the responsibility of Messer, and ultimately the manufacturer. Mance LJ concluded as follows.

Thorpe LJ and Neuberger J concurred.

See also
Consumer Protection Act 1987

Notes

English unfair terms case law
2002 in case law
Court of Appeal (England and Wales) cases
2002 in British law